Jessica Grabowsky (born 8 April 1980) is a Finnish actress. She was nominated for the Jussi Award in the category of Best Actress in a Leading Role for her performance in the 2011 film Missä kuljimme kerran. In 2014, she was nominated a second time for the Jussi Award in the same category for her lead role in 8-pallo. Grabowsky graduated from the Helsinki Theatre Academy in 2007.

Early life 
Born in Siilinjärvi, Grabowsky's family spoke Swedish, as her mother is a Finland Swede from Ostrobothnia. Her surname is of Polish origin, and she has Russian ancestry through her grandmother, who, along with her mother, escaped from Russia to Finland during the Russian revolution. Before her acting career, Grabowsky worked as a waitress.

Selected filmography
Ilonen talo (2006)
Kotikatu (2009–2010)
Missä kuljimme kerran (2011)
Hulluna Saraan (2012)
8-pallo (2013)
Tjockare än vatten (Thicker than water, TV series, 2014–2020)
Midnattssol (Midnight Sun, 2016)
Tom of Finland (2017)
Bordertown, TV series, (2018–2019)

References

External links

1980 births
Living people
People from Siilinjärvi
Finnish actresses
Finnish film actresses
Swedish-speaking Finns
Finnish people of Polish descent
Finnish people of Russian descent
21st-century Finnish actresses